Samuel Hanna (1772?–1852), Irish presbyterian divine, was born at Kellswater, near Ballymena, Co. Antrim.

Education and training
He was educated at the University of Glasgow, graduating M.A. in 1789. In 1790 he was licensed by Ballymena presbytery.

Parish minister
He was ordained as minister of the presbyterian congregation of Drumbo, Co. Down, on 4 August 1795. His reputation as a preacher grew rapidly. On 11 December 1799 he was installed as minister of Rosemary Street, Belfast. He revived the congregation, and his meeting-house was handsomely rebuilt (opened 15 April 1832). A warm advocate of Sunday schools and of bible distribution, he was also one of the first to interest Irish presbyterians in the subject of missionary enterprise.

Professor
In 1816 the general synod resolved to provide a theological training for its students instead of sending them to Scotland. Hanna, in June 1817, was unanimously elected professor of divinity and church history, with an emolument of £36.00 a year (he retained his congregation). His lectures were given at the Academical Institution, Belfast. In the following year he was made D.D. of Glasgow. In 1835 he obtained a coadjutor, Samuel Davidson, D.D., in the department of biblical criticism, and in 1837 was relieved of the departments of ecclesiastical history and pastoral theology by the appointment of James Seaton Reid, D.D., the historian. In 1840 Hanna was freed from active pastoral work by the election of William Gibson, D.D., as his assistant and successor at Rosemary Street. On 10 July 1840 he was chosen first Moderator of the General Assembly of the Presbyterian Church in Ireland, formed at that date by the union of the Synod of Ulster and the Secession Synod.

Works
Love to Christ: An Incitement to Ministerial and Missionary Exertions (1822) 
Sympathy of Irish Presbyterians with the Church of Scotland (1840)

Death and legacy
Hanna died at the residence of his son-in-law, Dr. Denham, at Derry, on 23 April 1852, in his eighty-first year. His portrait hangs in the hall of Union Theological College, Belfast. William Hanna, D.D. (1808-1882) was his son. He published a few sermons and pamphlets, the earliest being his sermon as moderator of the general synod, Belfast, 1809.

Sources
Belfast News Letter, 30 April 1852; Orthodox Presbyterian, May 1832, p. 288; James Seaton Reid's History of the Presbyterian Church in Ireland (Killen), 1867, iii. pp 447, 464, William Dool Killen's 
History of congregations of the Presbyterian Church in Ireland, 1886, pp.63-4, 126, 258-9

Notes

References

Irish Presbyterian ministers
Moderators of the Presbyterian Church in Ireland